The Merchant of Yonkers is a 1938 play by Thornton Wilder.

History
The Merchant of Yonkers had its origins in a 1835 one-act farce A Day Well Spent, by the English dramatist John Oxenford. In 1842 A Day Well Spent was extended into a full-length play entitled He'll Have Himself a Good Time by Austrian playwright Johann Nestroy. Wilder adapted Nestroy's 1842 version into an Americanized comedy entitled The Merchant of Yonkers, which revolves around Horace Vandergelder, a wealthy Yonkers, New York businessman in the market for a wife.

Productions

Produced by Herman Shumlin and directed by Max Reinhardt, The Merchant of Yonkers opened on Broadway December 28, 1938, at the Guild Theatre. Boris Aronson created the scenic design. The production ran through January 1939, for 39 performances, with the following among the cast:

 Percy Waram as Horace Vandergelder
 Jane Cowl as Dolly Gallagher Levi
 Tom Ewell as Cornelius Hackl
 Philip Coolidge as Joe Scanlon
 Bartlett Robinson as Ambrose Kemper
 Joseph Sweeney as Melchior Stack 
 June Walker as Mrs. Molloy
 Nydia Westman as Minnie Fay

Rewrite

In 1954, at the request of Edinburgh Festival director Tyrone Guthrie, Wilder made what he later termed "minor revisions" to his original script and rechristened the piece The Matchmaker, under which title it was presented in Edinburgh, followed by a West End theatre production in London which opened at Theatre Royal Haymarket on November 4, 1954. An American production of the revised play opened on Broadway on December 5, 1955, with Ruth Gordon as Dolly and had a far more successful run of 486 performances, followed by a motion picture version starring Shirley Booth as Dolly. The Matchmaker later served as the basis for Jerry Herman's 1964 musical hit Hello, Dolly!, running for 2,844 performances.

References

External links

 Internet Broadway Database listing
 Internet Broadway Database listing for The Matchmaker
 thorntonwilder.com

1938 plays
Broadway plays
Plays by Thornton Wilder
Culture of Yonkers, New York
Plays set in the 19th century
Plays set in New York (state)
Plays based on other plays
A Day Well Spent